Ovcullu (also, Ovculu, Oudzhulu, and Ovdzhulu) is a village in the Qabala Rayon of Azerbaijan.  The village forms part of the municipality of Mamaylı.

References 

Populated places in Qabala District